Siphonosphaera is a genus of radiolarians. The genus contains bioluminescent species. It is a genus of colonial radiolarians (as opposed to solitary).

Species
The following species are recognized:
Siphonosphaera hippotis
Siphonosphaera magnisphaera Takahashi, 1991
Siphonosphaera martensi Brandt, 1905
Siphonosphaera polysiphonia Haeckel, 1887
Siphonosphaera socialis Haeckel, 1887

References 

Radiolarian genera
Polycystines
Bioluminescent radiolarians